Gyan Dutt was one of the most prominent music directors in Bollywood in the 1940s. He was music director for films such as Thokar (1939), Achhut (1940), Bhakta Surdas (1942), Sunehre Din (1949) and Ghayal (1951). Many of his songs were sung by K. L. Saigal. In 1948 he composed seven songs for a young Geeta Dutt in the films Chanda Ki Chandani and Hua Savera, although their most notable collaboration was Dilruba (1950) in which Dutt wrote eight songs, six of which were solos for Geeta Dutt.

Notable songs
Notable songs written by Gyan Dutt include:

"Chandanee Rat Aur Tare Khile Ho" (Bhakt Surdas) Sung by: Khursheed, K L Saigal
"Din Se Dugunee Ho Jaye Ratiya Hay" (Bhakt Surdas) Sung by: K L Saigal
"Jholee Bhar Tare La De Re" (Bhakt Surdas) Sung by: Khursheed
"Kadam Chale Aage Mann Pichhe Bhage" (Bhakt Surdas) Sung by: K L Saigal
"Madhur Madhur Ga Re Manawa" (Bhakt Surdas) Sung by: Khursheed
"Meraa Kaha Hai Man Meraa" (Gul-E-Bakaavali) Sung by: Talat Mahmood, P G Krishnaveni
"More Mann Kee Nagariya Basayee Re" (Kanchan) Sung by: Leela Chitnis, Muzumdar
"Nain Hi Ko Rah Dikha Prabhu" (Bhakt Surdas) Sung by: K L Saigal
"Naina Re Dekhe Unake Nain" (Bhakt Surdas) Sung by: Khursheed
"Nis Din Barsat Nain Hamare" (Bhakt Surdas) Sung by: Mainder, K L Saigal
"Panchhi Bawara Chand Se Prit Lagaye" (Bhakt Surdas) Sung by: Khursheed
"Sar Pe Kadam Kee Chainyya Muraliya Baje Ree" (Bhakt Surdas) Sung by: K L Saigal, Rajkumari
"Woh Gaye Nahee Hame Milke" (Nurse) Sung by: Rajkumari
"Yaad Teree Aayee Hai" (Nadi Kinaare) Sung by: Gyan Dutt

Selected films

Gorakh Aya (1938)
Secretary (1938)
Aap Ki Marzi (1939)
Thokar (1939)
Sant Tulsidas (1939)
Achhut (1940)
Chingari (1940)
Sajani (1940)
Musafir (1940)
Beti (1941)
Sasural (1941)
Bhakta Surdas (1942)
Dhiraj
Anban (1944)
Manjhdhar (1947)
Chanda Ki Chandani (1948)
Hua Savera (1948)
Sunehre Din (1949)
Dilruba (1950)
Ghayal (1951)
Gul-E-Bakavali (1956)

References

External links
 
Video
Songs and lyrics
Geetadutt.com article

Hindi film score composers
20th-century Indian composers
Indian male composers
Male film score composers
20th-century male musicians